Thomas-Joachim Hébert (1687–1773) was a leading Parisian marchand-mercier supplying the court (suivant le Cour) of Louis XV of France.

In the 1720s, Hébert commissioned furniture from the workshops of André-Charles Boulle. Among the ébénistes working to his commissions in later days was Bernard II van Risamburgh; about 1750, he supplied furniture by Bernard to the minister Jean-Baptiste de Machault d'Arnouville, some of which can be traced in modern collections.

See also
Lazare Duvaux

Notes

French furniture designers
1687 births
1773 deaths